VA-165, nicknamed the Boomers, was a long-lived Attack Squadron of the U.S. Navy. It was established on 1 September 1960, and disestablished 35 years later on 30 September 1996.
The squadron operated in the region of Vietnam, Laos, and Korea during the 1960s and early 1970s.  VA-165 transferred to the Persian Gulf after the 1973 Yom Kippur War, and also served near the Philippines during the late 1970s.  During the 1980s, VA-165 was moved from the Middle East to Central America, particularly Nicaragua, back to Iran in the Middle East, off to South Korea, and then to the Middle East again for Kuwait.  During the 1990s, the squadron worked in the United States, the Middle East, and Taiwan.

History

1960s
VA-165 was commissioned on 1 September 1960. The squadron began participation in combat operations over Laos in February 1965. 

This was the first all attack air wing and the first to deploy. Two squadrons flew the A-1 Skyraider and the other two squadrons flew the A-4 Skyhawk.

Ranger and VA-165 operated in the area until relieved on 5 March 1968. In April 1969, following the shooting down of a Navy EC-121 aircraft by the North Koreans on 15 April, Ranger, with VA-165 embarked, left Yankee Station and proceeded to the Sea of Japan for operations off the coast of Korea.

1970s
On 26 May 1970: The squadron's commanding officer, Commander F. M. Backman, flew the newest update version of the A-6 Intruder, the A-6C, into combat for the first time. In April 1972, VA-165 participated in Operation Freedom Train, tactical air sorties against military and logistic targets in the southern part of North Vietnam. It also provided support for forces in South Vietnam following a massive invasion by North Vietnam on 1 April 1972. In May, the squadron participated in the early phase of Operation Linebacker I, heavy air strikes against targets in North Vietnam above 20 degrees north latitude.

This was the first time in 26 years that an American carrier had entered and operated in the Persian Gulf. In March 1979: Constellation, with VA-165 embarked, was ordered to make a high speed transit to the Indian Ocean from the Philippines in response to the conflict between North and South Yemen.

1980s
In October 1981, the squadron received the A-6E TRAM Intruder and became the first operational A-6 unit to deploy with the capability to fire the AGM-84A Harpoon. Between July–August 1983, USS Ranger, with VA-165 embarked, was ordered to operate off the coast of Nicaragua in response to the possible invasion of Honduras by Nicaragua. From October 1983–January 1984: Ranger, with VA-165 embarked, was extended on station in the Arabian Sea due to the threat by Iran to block oil exports from the Persian Gulf. In September 1988, with VA-165 embarked, operated in the Sea of Japan in support of the Summer Olympic Games in Seoul, Republic of Korea. In November, their aircraft participated in Operation Earnest Will, the escorting of reflagged Kuwaiti tankers through the Persian Gulf. In 1989, While deployed near the United States, their aircraft participated in the filming of Flight of the Intruder.

1990s

In 1990, VA-165 transitioned to the A-6E SWIP Intruder. That same year, the squadron sailed with the Constellation as the carrier moved back to East Coast around Cape Horn for its SLEP (Service Life Extension Program) overhaul.

Between February 25 and August 24, 1991; the squadron made deployment to the Persian Gulf region in the aftermath of the Gulf War. On February 2, 1993, they deployed again to take part in Operation Southern Watch. This was the last deployment that the KA-6D Tanker made with the US Navy, with VA-165 retiring it after their return.

VA-165's last deployment began on November 27, 1995. On the 19th of December, the squadron along with the Nimitz transited the Taiwan Strait during the early period of the Third Taiwan Strait Crisis. During the first part of 1996, the squadron flew missions in support of Southern Watch. However, when the Taiwan Strait crisis worsened in March 1996, VA-165 and the Nimitz Battlegroup were ordered to rush to the Taiwan Strait. On 26 July 1996, VA-165 held its decommissioning ceremony, with squadron being formally disestablished on 30 September 1996.

Home port assignments
The squadron was assigned to these home ports, effective on the dates shown:
 NAS Jacksonville – 01 Sep 1960
 NAS Moffett Field – 07 Sep 1961
 NAS Alameda – 10 Mar 1964
 NAS Whidbey Island – 01 Jan 1967

Aircraft assignment
The squadron first received the following aircraft on the dates shown:
 AD-6/A-1H Skyraider – 04 Oct 1960
 A-1J Skyraider – Jun 1963
 A-6A Intruder – May 1967
 A-6B Intruder – Nov 1969
 A-6C Intruder – 27 Feb 1970
 KA-6D Intruder – 28 Mar 1971
 A-6E Intruder – 20 Jan 1975
 A-6E TRAM Intruder – 1981
 A-6E SWIP Intruder – 1990

See also
 List of squadrons in the Dictionary of American Naval Aviation Squadrons
 Attack aircraft
 List of inactive United States Navy aircraft squadrons
 History of the United States Navy

References

Further reading

External links

Attack squadrons of the United States Navy
Wikipedia articles incorporating text from the Dictionary of American Naval Aviation Squadrons